Griseidraconarius is a genus of east Asian funnel weavers. It was first described by K. Okumura in 2020, and it has only been found in Japan.  it contains only three species: G. akakinaensis, G. decolor, and G. iriei.

See also
 List of Agelenidae species

References

Further reading

Agelenidae genera
Endemic fauna of the Ryukyu Islands